The opening ceremony of the delayed 2020 Summer Olympics took place on 23 July 2021 at Olympic Stadium, Tokyo, and was formally opened by Emperor Naruhito. As mandated by the Olympic Charter, the proceedings combined the formal and ceremonial opening of this international sporting event, including welcoming speeches, hoisting of the flags and the parade of athletes, with an artistic spectacle to showcase the host nation's culture and history. The majority of the artistic spectacle was pre-recorded, with live segments performed adhering to social distancing to athletes, officials and a small VIP audience. The ceremony marked the 125th anniversary of the 1896 Summer Olympics in Athens—the inaugural edition of the modern Olympic Games.

The theme of the 2020 Olympic and Paralympic Ceremonies was Moving Forward, which referenced the global COVID-19 pandemic. The opening ceremony theme was the Tokyo 2020 motto United by Emotion, with the aim to "reaffirm the role of sport and the value of the Olympic Games." The ceremony expressed responses to the pandemic by the athlete community, congratulate front-line workers, and included themes of lament, waiting and hope. The ceremony also showcased Japanese popular culture such as Japanese theater, video games, and variety shows, such as Kasou Taishou. For the first time in an Olympic opening ceremony, a minute of silence was observed in honor of 50 years since the Munich Massacre at the 1972 Summer Olympics.

Preparations

January 2017–December 2020: Original Plans

The Tokyo Organising Committee of the Olympic and Paralympic Games (TOCOG) gave the first report of preparations in December 2017, with the release of the "Basic Policy" document for the Olympic and Paralympic ceremonies. The document was based upon feedback from experts and opinions of the Japanese public and includes the foundational elements for the positioning and overall concept of the four ceremonies. The Olympic opening ceremony is to introduce the themes and concepts of the four ceremonies, including peace, coexistence, reconstruction, the future, Japan and Tokyo, the athletes and involvement.

Between July 2018 and December 2020, Mansai Nomura, an actor in traditional Japanese theater, was the chief creative director. Marco Balich of Balich Worldwide Shows, is the Senior Adviser to the Executive Producer. Balich was involved as producer of the ceremonies of the 2006 Winter Olympics, 2014 Winter Olympics and the 2016 Summer Olympics, and has done other international ceremonies such as the 2019 Summer Universiade and the 2019 Pan American Games in Lima. In July 2019, he mentioned that his involvement will be in partnership with the Japanese advertising company Dentsu. Dentsu's creative director for these ceremonies, Kaoru Sugano, resigned in January 2020 over harassment claims.

The new National Stadium, called Olympic Stadium during the Games, served as the main stadium for the opening ceremony. Demolition of old National Stadium was completed in May 2015. Construction of the new stadium began at the site on 11 December 2016. The stadium was handed over to the IOC on 30 November 2019 for preparations. Had the pandemic not happen, capacity of the stadium during the Olympic Games would have been 60,102, including account press and executive seating areas. Before the announcement of barring spectators was made, ticket prices for the Opening Ceremony were expected to range between ¥12,000 and ¥300,000.

Previous Olympic opening ceremonies in Japan, such as the 1998 Winter Olympics opening ceremony in Nagano, mixed ancient Japanese cultural elements with themes of international peace. Reports from Inside the Games and Kyodo News in January 2020 suggested that there would be a bigger focus on Japanese technology and its popular culture in this ceremony. According to reports from Shūkan Bunshun, the original program would include numerous references to J-pop and video games with the creative team led by MIKIKO before it was scaled back. The plan was to follow on with what was presented in the Rio 2016 closing ceremony, where then Prime Minister Shinzo Abe dressed as Mario in the handover segment.

According to the leak, the following artists, musicians, actors and cultural franchises were to appear in the ceremony:
The ceremony would have begun with an emulation from a scene inAkira manga where Kaneda is racing on a motorcycle;
Pop group Perfume were due to sing "Welcome to Tokyo" using computer generated imagery of the city's scenery and repesenting the Special wards of Tokyo;
Singer Daichi Miura was to perform from a wired frame car as a Tokyo Station staff member before his face turning into a tree;
Actress Tao Tsuchiya and Tomohiko Tsujimoto were due to dance in a scene representing vitality of Japanese nature scenery before a tree turned into an eye and a clock, with then dancing duo AyaBambi to dance in the middle of the clock;
Dancer Koharu Sugawara was to perform a traditional tea ceremony;
Dance group Tokyo Gegegay along with local high school students were due to perform with influences from the anime film Neo Tokyo;
The Japanese flag raising ceremony would have involved actor Mirai Moriyama holding a glowing bō stick using martial arts moves before children with lanterns would carry the Japanese flag;
Comedian Naomi Watanabe was to perform in a skit as an office worker stuck in a post-apocalyptic world mimicking a flashback of the 1964 Summer Olympics. Dancers with balls would have appeared with her and "READY" sign was to be shown before athletes entering the stadium;
Artist Lady Gaga was to make an appearance;
Before the lighting of the Olympic Cauldron, a segment featuring popular video games and anime would be performed before the lighting of the Olympic Flame, with Nintendo representatives including Mario creator Shigeru Miyamoto supervising the segment. Mario would have set to appear from a Warp Pipe, with appearances from well-known video game characters including Pac-Man, Pikachu from Pokémon and Sonic the Hedgehog, and anime characters Hello Kitty, Tsubasa Oozora from Captain Tsubasa, Doraemon and Goku from Dragon Ball. Mario would then reappear on an 8-bit with a group of dancers were to perform as various Olympic sports.

December 2020–July 2021: COVID-19 Impact
In February 2020, after announcements concerning scaling back the Tokyo marathon due to the effects of COVID-19, health officials began to question whether the Olympic opening ceremony would also be impacted. On 24 March 2020, the IOC and the Tokyo Organizing Committee officially announced that due to the ongoing pandemic in Japan, the 2020 Summer Olympics and Paralympics would be delayed to 2021, and held no later than Summer 2021 (marking the first time that an entire Olympics was postponed). On 30 March 2020, it was announced that the ceremony would take place on 23 July 2021.

In December 2020, it was announced that Normura stepped down from Chief Creative Director as the original ceremony team disbanded, and Hiroshi Sasaki was announced as the new director. Normura became an advisor. At the press conference, Sasaki pointed out that the previous plans were scrapped as it was considered too extravagant, which suggested that it would be simplified as per audience expectations.

In March 2021, Sasaki resigned after making a derogatory comment about Japanese comedian and fashion icon Naomi Watanabe. The reports came a month after Yoshirō Mori, president of the Tokyo 2020 Organising Committee, resigned over derogatory comments made about female members of the committee. Since March 2021 until 22 July 2021, Kentarō Kobayashi was made chief creative director, with Takayuki Hioki, managing director of Sports Branding Japan, promoted to deputy chief ceremonies officer and executive producer.

During organizing talks in late 2020, concerns were raised over who could attend the Opening Ceremony. In July 2021, the organizers agreed that the ceremony would be performed with no live audience, except for competing athletes if they choose to attend, a maximum of six officials for each country's delegation, and invited VIP guests. Much of the artistic and cultural sections of the ceremony will adhere to social distancing guidelines, and the majority of segments will be pre-recorded.

In a press release released on 14 July 2021, the committee announced the themes and the creative team for the opening and closing of the Olympics and Paralympics. The theme of the Olympic ceremonies would be called "Moving Forward" referencing the world recovering from the COVID-19 pandemic. The creative team state that they "have designed the ceremonies around the concept that the Games can bring fresh hope and encouragement to people around the world through the active appearance of athletes at the Tokyo 2020 Games and via the power of sport." This was expected, as just after the postponement in March 2020, Balich said that the crisis would be mentioned at some point during the ceremony due to its significance at the games.

In that same press release, it found that they appointed Keigo Oyamada of Cornelius as one of the composers. The appointment prompted criticism on social media due to Oyamada's past bullying of people with apparent disabilities, such as Down syndrome. Oyamada admitted the disability abuse in interviews that resurfaced after his appointment. On 16 July, a week before the opening ceremony, the Organizing Committee of the Olympic and Paralympic Games, which was questioned for insight and good sense, announced their support for him to continue as a composer. Toshirō Mutō, the chief executive of the Organizing Committee, said he wanted Oyamada to remain involved. However, on 19 July, Oyamada formally apologized, resigned and withdrew his music from the ceremony.

On 22 July 2021, the day before the ceremony, Kentarō Kobayashi, the chief creative director of the ceremonies after Sasaki resigned, was fired by the organizing committee for making jokes about the Holocaust in a comedy routine in 1998, and the committee asked for a review of the ceremony content before it was performed. That evening, Prime Minister Yoshihide Suga, who serves as the Supreme Advisor and Chairperson of the Organizing Committee, described Kobayashi's Holocaust jokes as "outrageous and unacceptable", but also said that the opening ceremony, prepared and directed by Kobayashi, should proceed as planned.

Concept

"Moving Forward" was the overarching theme for both 2020 Opening and Closing Ceremonies, as announced by Tokyo 2020: the ceremonies were linked by the concept of "Moving Forward", a reference to recovering from the COVID-19 pandemic. The artistic team said in a statement, "We have designed the ceremonies around the concept that the Games can bring fresh hope and encouragement to people around the world through the active appearance of athletes at the Tokyo 2020 Games and via the power of sport." "United by Emotion," the official motto of the Games, was adopted as the theme of the Opening Ceremony.

The Opening and Closing Ceremonies was produced by Takayuki Hioki, having been advised by Marco Balich, who notably was part of the development team for the 2006 Winter Olympics in Turin. Balich said of the ceremony that "We will aspire to reaffirm the role of sport and the value of the Olympic Games, to express our gratitude and admiration for the efforts we all made together over the past year, and also to bring a sense of hope for the future. We hope it will be an experience that conveys how we all have the ability to celebrate differences, to empathise, and to live side by side with compassion for one another." Although the creative director of the Opening ceremony, Kentarō Kobayashi, was fired on the day before the ceremony due to the past jokes of The Holocaust, the organising committee decided to proceed with the ceremony as prepared and directed by him.

Weather conditions
 20:00 temperature  humidity 72% 
 23:00 temperature  humidity 78%
 At the observation point, it rained in between 20:30 and 20:45, and between 21:20 and 21:35,  to the extent that an hourly rainfall of 0 (mm) was recorded.

Proceedings

Program
The event, which was set to last three and a half hours, started at 20:00 JST, featured many sequences of the ceremony which were pre-recorded. As part of the "Moving Forward" theme, many segments involved diverse representation and building or re-building. The titles from this section largely come from the organisers.

Prelude

On the day of the ceremony, there was an exhibition flight by Blue Impulse, the aerobatics squadron of the Japanese Air Self Defense Force. The squadron drew the Olympic Rings over the Tokyo skies, marked the 57th anniversary of the 1964 Games for the first time in Tokyo.

Where the Stories Begin
A stop motion video begins showing many geometric shapes drawn in chalk, before showing a birds eye shot of the stadium. The camera zooms in on National Stadium, while a flock of doves fly by. The camera zooms into the grass ground where it focuses on a seed. Cutting to a live shot, an athlete is lit in green, while a projection of a seedling growing is shown behind the athlete.

A videotaped montage of Tokyo's recap to hosting the Games began, from awarding the rights in 2013 during the 125th IOC Session, to the hard work and training of the athletes, to the Olympic Games Rio 2016, to the qualification of the athletes and then, the chaotic events of 2020 when the world suddenly changed, which caused the athletes to continue training from home via video communication. A countdown from '21' referencing the postponement of games played, showing athletes overcoming the challenges of the past year. At 0, 694 fireworks then are then set off.

Apart but not Alone

The first performance of the ceremony, designed "[showcase] Japan's forte in digital art and projection mapping technology," featured a digital graphics projection on the stadium floor, at the centre of which nurse and boxer Arisa Tsubata, who won a national championship only two years after taking the sport, but was unable to participate as an athlete after being eliminated in the first round of the Asia & Oceania Boxing Olympic Qualification tournament held prior to the pandemic and the games' postponement, jogged on a treadmill, then was joined by performers on an exercise cycle, rowing machine, running in place, while performers abstract danced and coloured ball of light were projected, "symbolising the athletes' plight in training during the pandemic for this event."
A dance presentation was performed with dancers wearing white outfits connected by red strings, meant to "portray the inner workings of the body and heart."

A Welcome from the Host
The following act featured the Japanese national flag and was carried by six bearers. They are:
 Yoshinobu Miyake, two time Olympic weightlifting champion
 Naoko Takahashi, Olympic marathon champion
 , Youth Olympic curling medallist
 Hibiki Sakai, percussionist
 , Youth Olympic sport climbing champion
 Mizuki Asaba, a rescue worker who was involved in search and rescue (SAR) mission of the victims of the 2011 Tōhoku earthquake and tsunami

Then, veteran singer Misia, who wore a dress designed "to honour the LGBTQ+ community and symbolise the fight for LGBTQ+ equality" made by openly gay costume designer Tomo Koizumi, singing the National Anthem of Japan while the flag was raised up by the members of the Japan Self-Defense Forces. After the Japanese National Anthem was sung, a tribute was paid for those who had died from COVID-19, the 2011 Tōhoku earthquake and tsunami, and especially for the victims of the Munich 1972 massacre, one year before the 50th anniversary of that massacre. The actor Mirai Moriyama appeared up dressed in white and, after striking a pose of mourning, performed a  dance in the middle of the stadium, while tenebrous and funereal music played. Subsequently, a moment of silence was observed at the culmination of this section of the ceremony.

A Lasting Legacy

The unveiling of the Olympic Rings, which were made from trees planted from seeds during the 1964 Olympics, followed.

A pre-recorded video was shown of Muhammad Yunus receiving the Olympic Laurel award in Bangladesh, because Yunus could not travel to Japan due to travel restrictions related to the COVID-19 pandemic in that country.

Here Together

Parade of Nations 

The Parade of Nations followed with the team delegations marching into the stadium. 
Before the athletes marched, a videotaped section was shown showcasing how the world trained for these challenging Olympics.

Athletes entered the stadium in an order dictated by the Olympic tradition. As the originator of the Olympics, the Greek team entered first. Other teams entered in order of the  system based on the names of countries in the Japanese language, the first time this happened as previous Olympics held in Japan have used the English language. Following tradition, the delegation from the host nation Japan entered last.

The Refugee Olympic Team, composed of refugees from several countries, was the second nation to enter, after Greece. For the first time ever in the opening ceremony, the countries that will host the next two Olympic Games, France (in 2024) and the United States (in 2028), marched immediately before the host nation Japan entered, instead of entering one-hundred-fifty-fourth (between Brazil and Bulgaria) and seventh (between Afghanistan and United Arab Emirates), respectively, according to the Japanese alphabet order. 

The names of the teams were announced in French, followed by English and Japanese, the official languages of the Olympic movement and the host nation, in accordance with traditional and International Olympic Committee (IOC) guidelines.

Each of the signboards displaying the countries' names was written in Japanese on one side and English on the other, enclosed in speech balloons, evoking manga panels, while the signholders' costumes had manga tones.

The athletes themselves attended in low numbers compared to previous Olympics, as out of Team USA's 613 and Australia's 472, only about 200 and 63 attended, respectively.

In their entrances, several teams, including Argentina and Ghana, broke into song, while the Twitter account for the Games pointed out an Eritrean athlete who laid down on the ground, which other athletes had done as well while looking at their phones. As Russia had been banned to partake in sporting events by the World Anti-Doping Agency, Russian athletes marched under the ROC designation and flag. Japan inverted the colours of the uniform they had used in the 1964 Olympics, while France paraded in three rows, representing the tricolor flag. Two flagbearers, Tonga's Pita Taufatofua and Vanautu's Riilio Rii, paraded shirtless and oiled. Noticeably, several members of the Kyrgyz and Tajik delegations as well as the Pakistani flagbearers entered the ceremony maskless. During the parade of nations, Mohamad Maso of Syria was reunited with his brother, Alaa, who represented the IOC Refugee Olympic Team.

For the first time, each team had the option to allow two flag bearers, one male and one female, in an effort to promote gender equality.

Before the athletes paraded in, a sign inside the stadium pointed out that the athletes should keep social distance between themselves and how far was the entrance as well as the restroom.

In addition, 19 tracks from popular Japanese video game series were also used during the duration of the two hour-long segment, these being:

These also became the last parade involving Afghanistan before the Taliban re-invasion of Kabul several weeks after the games.

A New Motto and Oath
The Parade of Nations finished with the projection of the Olympic motto, "Faster, Higher, Stronger – Together" in the middle of the stadium floor, between the athletes, which were organised into quadrants after they marched in. A message from Kirsty Coventry, the outgoing chair of the IOC Athletes' Commission was played, introducing the new Olympic Oath with the aim of promoting inclusion and the role of Athletes, Judges and Coaches as ambassadors. The following oath was delivered by 6 participants from the Tokyo delegation:

Imagine
Groups of all ages entered the stadium dancing around boxes, which were organised into three circles and then into the Olympic Games Tokyo 2020 emblem logo. Then, mirroring the previous segment, 1,824 drones made a 3D rendition of the Olympic Games Tokyo 2020 emblem logo over the stadium and then the globe of Earth with its continents.

Following this what Time Out Japan called an "emotional montage", featuring a "half-live, half-recorded performance" of "Imagine", composed by John Lennon, was sung by Angélique Kidjo (Africa), Alejandro Sanz (Europe), John Legend (Americas), and Keith Urban (Oceania), all of whom joined remotely via pre-recorded material; plus the Suginami Junior Chorus, who was live in the stadium. It was arranged by Hans Zimmer, and had musical support provided by TAIKOPROJECT and the Synchron Stage Orchestra and Stage Choir. "Imagine" had previously appeared at other Olympic ceremonies, including the 1996 Summer Olympics closing ceremony in Atlanta, the 2006 Winter Olympics opening ceremony in Torino, the 2012 Summer Olympics closing ceremony in London, and the 2018 Winter Olympics opening ceremony in PyeongChang.

Peace Through Sport
Seiko Hashimoto, President of the Tokyo Organising Committee of the Olympic and Paralympic Games and Thomas Bach, IOC president, then gave speeches. Hashimoto briefly spoke about the Tokyo Olympics as an example of overcoming difficulties, as the pitch to host the Olympics was for it to form part of the rebuilding effort after the 2011 Tōhoku earthquake and tsunami. She also called for the Olympic Truce to be observed. Bach in his 13-minute speech, highlighted that the Olympic movement showed the unifying power of sport, and expressed his gratitude to healthcare workers, the volunteers and described participating refugee athletes as an enrichment for society. Both speeches were scheduled to last a combined total of nine minutes, but in the ceremony the segment took over twice as long.

The opening declaration of the 2020 Olympic Games, limited to a prescribed statement of around 17 words, laid down in the Olympic Charter, was made by Emperor Naruhito. He was the third Japanese Emperor to open an Olympics, following his grandfather Emperor Hirohito (1964 Summer and 1972 Winter Olympics) and his father Emperor Akihito (1998 Winter Olympics). He was also the honorary patron of Tokyo 2020 Olympic and Paralympics.

After Naruhito declared the Games open, 288 fireworks were set off.

The Olympic Flag then entered the stadium. Many of the flag bearers were both athletes and front-line nurses, doctors and healthcare workers during the pandemic. The flag bearers were:
Asia: Kento Momota, Badminton
Oceania: Elena Galiabovitch, Shooter and Physician
Americas: Paula Pareto, Judoka and Physician
Africa: Mehdi Essadiq, Triathlon
Europe: Paola Egonu, Volleyball
IOC Refugee Olympic Team: Cyrille Tchatchet II, Weightlifter and Nurse

It was then handed to front line workers from Japan and was raised by the Japan Guard. The Olympic Anthem was sung in English by the choir composed of high school students from Tokyo and Fukushima.

Finally, while an English recording of Susan Boyle performing the Japanese folk song  (Wings to Fly) played, doves were projected on the stadium floor, before thousands of paper doves fluttered into the stadium.

Let the Games Begin & Time to Shine
A video sequence showed the history of the Olympic pictograms had been introduced at the Olympic Games 1964 (also in Tokyo), followed by a live-action recreation of the 50 pictograms used for the events of this Olympic Games. Out of the 50 pictograms, 48 were acted out by the performers using camera angles and various props, some done live in the middle of the stadium, others in prerecorded segments additionally with hand gestures, finger tutting, studio lights, and karate gi. During one prerecorded segment, parts of the song "Camptown Races" could be briefly heard while the equestrian-related pictograms were recreated. The first pictogram shown, the one for the modern pentathlon, was initially depicted as a static image before the performer portraying the running figure moved out of place, setting up the nature of the performance, while the one for sailing was found printed on a propsman's shirt. The segment was directed by HIRO-PON, (from Gamarjobat)  with the segment being called "a funny, witty performance reminiscent of a typical Japanese TV game show" like Kasou Taishou.

Following this, a lighting technician played by the comedian Hitori Gekidan was seen on camera to switch on the lights for several Tokyo and national landmarks across Japan. The Olympic champion and former figure skater Shizuka Arakawa was also involved in this sketch.

The segment, "intended to dispel negative energy," symbolised the mixing of both traditional Japanese performing arts and the Japanese affection towards modern jazz.

Hope Lights Our Way

Before the flame arrived at the stadium, a recap video played showcasing the flame's journey across Japan featuring the song Teo Torriatte (Let Us Cling Together) performed by Queen. The flame was brought into the stadium at the end of the torch relay by wrestler Saori Yoshida and judoka Tadahiro Nomura. It was carried by a trio of Japanese baseball greats (Shigeo Nagashima, Sadaharu Oh, and Hideki "Godzilla" Matsui), a doctor and a nurse, paralympian Wakako Tsuchida, and a group of students from Iwate, Miyagi, and Fukushima prefectures who were born shortly before the 2011 Tōhoku earthquake and tsunami. Finally Japanese tennis player Naomi Osaka carried it up the steps to light the Olympic cauldron; Osaka herself would compete for Japan in the Olympics before being eliminated in the third round of the women's tennis competition. Three hours later, the badminton player Ayaka Takahashi lit another cauldron, outside the stadium which was off–limits to guests.

In December 2018, organisers had stated that although the Olympic cauldron would be officially lit and extinguished at the stadium, the flame would be transferred to a separate, public cauldron (following the lead of the 2010 Winter Olympics in Vancouver and the 2016 Summer Olympics in Rio) at Ariake West Canal, on the Tokyo riverfront while the Games were in progress, and transferred back to Olympic Stadium for the closing ceremony. Organisers cited "physical difficulties" to keeping the flame at the New National Stadium due to the current Japanese legislation about fire effects use.  Due to the state of emergency, the cauldron was off-limits to guests and situated outside the Olympic Stadium.

The cauldron was designed by Canadian-Japanese designer Oki Sato, who attended Waseda University, the same university as Yoshinori Sakai, the cauldron-lighter in 1964. The steps to reach the cauldron, symbolising Mount Fuji, were "designed to evoke the image of a blooming sakura flower."

The music featured in the cauldron lighting included Boléro by Maurice Ravel, "Rise of the Planet 9" from Dr. Copellius, composed by Isao Tomita, followed by the fireworks featuring the music of Takashi Yoshimatsu's Symphony No. 2 "At terra".

Dignitaries in attendance

Even though the stadium had normally had a capacity for 68,000 spectators, however only 800 foreign and 150 local officials, who were deemed "Games stakeholders", were in attendance, as well as 3,500 members of the media and 6,000 members of team delegations, totalling 10,400. Even though it is customary for Olympic sponsors to send corporate representatives as well, companies such as Toyota, Panasonic, Procter & Gamble, NEC, and Fujitsu, opted out of attending. A scoreboard in the stadium warned the attendees to "Clap, Do not sing or chant".

Host country dignitaries
  Japan –
Emperor Naruhito
Prime Minister Yoshihide Suga
Governor of Tokyo Yuriko Koike
President of the Tokyo Organising Committee of the Olympic and Paralympic Games Seiko Hashimoto

Dignitaries from abroad

  Armenia – President Armen Sarksyan
  Australia – Minister for Sport Richard Colbeck and Queensland Premier Annastacia Palaszczuk
 Bulgaria – Minister of Youth and Sports Andrey Kuzmanov
 Canada – Minister of Employment, Workforce Development and Disability Inclusion Carla Qualtrough
  China – Chinese Olympic Committee (COC) President Gou Zhongwen
  Croatia – Former president and member of the International Olympic Committee Kolinda Grabar-Kitarović
  Finland – Minister of Science and Culture Antti Kurvinen
  France – President Emmanuel Macron
 Greece – Deputy Minister of Culture and Sport Lefteris Avgenakis
  India – Minister of Sports Anurag Thakur
  Italy – Secretary for sports Valentina Vezzali
 Jordan – Prince Faisal bin Hussein (representing The King of Jordan)
  Kosovo – President Vjosa Osmani
 Lithuania – Vice Minister for Science, Education, and Sport Linas Obcarskas
  Luxembourg – Grand Duke Henri
  Monaco – Sovereign Prince of Monaco Albert II
  Mongolia – Prime Minister Luvsannamsrain Oyun-Erdene
  Montenegro – Prime Minister Zdravko Krivokapić
  Poland – President Andrzej Duda
 San Marino – Captains Regent Gian Carlo Venturini and Marco Nicolini
  Singapore - Speaker of the Parliament Tan Chuan-Jin
 Slovenia – Minister for Research, Education and Sport Simona Kustec
  South Korea – Minister of Culture, Sports and Tourism Hwang Hee
  South Sudan – Fourth Vice President Rebecca Nyandeng De Mabior
  Switzerland – President Guy Parmelin
  Turkmenistan – Deputy Prime Minister Serdar Berdimukhamedov
  United Kingdom – Minister for Sport Nigel Huddleston
  United States – First Lady Jill Biden

Dignitaries from International organizations
  International Olympic Committee – President Thomas Bach and IOC members, Chair of the IOC Ethics Commission and Former Secretary-General of the United Nations Ban Ki-moon
   United Nations – High Commissioner for Refugees Filippo Grandi 
  World Health Organization – Director-General Tedros Adhanom

Anthems
 National Anthem of Japan – Misia
 Olympic Anthem – Fukushima Students' Choir

Controversies

Outside the venue, protesters' opposing the Olympics being run during the pandemic was held in the southwestern corner of the Stadium, timed so that it would coincide with the ceremony. The protestors' chant, "Go to hell, IOC," could be heard by media inside the stadium during some of the quieter moments.

Another scandal involving musicians was the dropping of the Senegalese-born Japanese percussionist, Latyr Sy, allegedly due to the organizers' reticence in having an "African" in the ceremony. He had been hired in May and had the rehearsal schedule sent to him in April, however, upon enquiring about signing his contract in May, he was informed that his inclusion in the program had been rejected due to his ethnicity. A spokesperson of the organising committee later gave background to Sy's claim saying, "We had planned a music part in which many singers would participate, but due to infectious disease control and budget, we cancelled the part itself. Therefore we cancelled the appearance of all the participants in the music part."

When Emperor Naruhito began the opening declaration, Prime Minister Yoshihide Suga and Governor of Tokyo Yuriko Koike remained seated, and only stood halfway through. On Japanese social media, some criticized their confusion as disrespectful to the Emperor. Governor Koike spoke later to press that he felt embarrassed standing up halfway through. The organizing committee later apologized for the wording at the end of Thomas Bach speech as he could not make an announcement in the stadium to encourage everyone to stand up before the Emperor spoke.

Ceremony key team 
Source:

Reception 
The ceremony was panned as being solemn and muted in comparison to previous Olympic ceremonies, with the lack of audience due to the state of emergency being a factor in the atmosphere, to the point that journalist Ian Dunt compared it to attending a funeral. It was also largely panned for being too long and confusing. Japanese Entertainment writer Elizabeth Matsumoto was confused by some elements of the ceremony such as the Matsuri segment, questioning why to focus on carpentry and if the tap dancing was necessary. Others criticized Bach's 13 minute speech where some athletes sat down during the segment.

Those who understood that the ceremony would be more muted, such as Jen Chaney from Vulture, opined that while it was largely entertaining and showed the perseverance of the human spirit, it also showed the pessimism and difficulties of holding the Summer Olympics during a pandemic, summarizing the theme of the ceremony as asking the question "What exactly are we doing here, and why?"

Some did give positive reviews to the celebratory segments, including a segment featuring dancers re-creating the poses of the Games' pictograms. Moreover, some Japanese reviewers felt that Misia's performance of the Japanese Anthem was excellent and dignified given the difficulties of performing the anthem live. Others felt that the ceremony showed an unmistakably contemporary and diverse view of Japan, finishing with Osaka lighting the cauldron, who is biracial and has opened up about her mental health.

Broadcasting
In Japan, state broadcaster NHK aired the opening ceremony in 8K with 22.2 surround sound and hybrid log-gamma (HLG) HDR. Despite wide opposition to the Olympics by residents, the opening ceremony was seen in Japan by at least 73.27 million viewers nationwide, with NHK peaking at a 61% audience share during a segment featuring Miki Maya and at the start of the parade of nations. CEO of Olympic Broadcasting Services (OBS) Yiannis Exarchos stated that the opening ceremony was the most-watched Japanese television broadcast in the last 10 years. Locally, it was reported that the opening ceremony had achieved a 56% audience share in the Kantō region, making it the most-watched television broadcast in the region since the opening ceremony of the 1964 Summer Olympics.

South Korean broadcaster MBC faced criticism for showing profiles of countries with insensitive or stereotypical facts and images during the parade of nations, such as Italy being represented by a picture of pizza, Portugal being represented by a picture of egg tarts, Romania represented by a picture of Dracula, Ukraine represented by a photo of the Chernobyl disaster, Syria's profile mentioning the Syrian civil war, and Haiti described as having an "unstable political situation due to the assassination of the president". MBC CEO Park Sung-jae apologized for the imagery, stating that the network had "damaged the Olympic values of friendship, solidarity and harmony" with the images, which had been intended to help viewers identify the countries.

In the United States, NBC announced that it would broadcast and stream the opening ceremony live in all time zones, (6:55 a.m. Eastern/3:55 a.m. Pacific) in addition to its traditional tape-delayed prime time broadcasts. With a reported 17 million viewers, ratings declined 36% over the 2016 opening ceremony, while streaming viewers were up by 76%.

In Canada, in addition to the main English and French-language broadcasts on CBC Television and Ici Radio-Canada Télé, CBC/Radio-Canada simulcasted the opening ceremony with streaming broadcasts in 8 Indigenous languages: East Cree, Dehcho Dene, Dënësųłinë́ Yałtı, Gwichʼin, Inuktitut, Inuvialuktun, Sahtu Dene and Tłı̨chǫ.

See also
2020 Summer Olympics cauldron
2020 Summer Olympics closing ceremony
2020 Summer Paralympics opening ceremony
2020 Summer Paralympics closing ceremony

References

External links

 In the video on the website ( sports.nhk.or.jp ), You can watch it in the full version of 4 hours 3 minutes 8 seconds.

Opening ceremony
Ceremonies in Japan
July 2021 events in Japan
Olympic Games controversies
Olympics opening ceremonies